Blood Diner is a 1987 American horror comedy directed by Jackie Kong and starring Rick Burks, Carl Crew, Roger Dauer, LaNette LaFrance, and Lisa Guggenheim. It was written by Michael Sonye. The plot follows two brothers setting up a restaurant as a front for them to kill women and collect their severed body-parts to summon forth the Lumerian goddess Sheetar.

The film was originally conceived to be a sequel to Blood Feast, but it was then changed to be a standalone film of its own. Although general reception towards the film has been mixed, it has become a cult film since its release.

Plot
Two brothers, Michael Tutman (Rick Burks) and George Tutman (Carl Crew) are brainwashed by their serial killer uncle Anwar Namtut (Drew Godderis) into completing his task of resurrecting the ancient Lumerian goddess Sheetar (Tanya Papanicolas). Their mission is given to them once they resurrect him from his grave. Anwar Namtut is from then on a brain in a mason jar that commands the brothers. In order to complete their mission, the brothers must collect different body parts from many immoral women, stitch them together, and then call forth the goddess at a "blood buffet" with a virgin to sacrifice ready for her to eat. The brothers choose women for their "blood buffet" from those that enter into their wildly popular vegetarian restaurant. Meanwhile, two mismatched detectives (LaNette LaFrance and Roger Dauer) work together to try to track them down before more carnage can ensue.

Cast

Release

The film was given a limited release theatrically in the United States by Lightning Pictures, Inc. in July 1987. It was released on VHS the same year by Vestron Video. The UK issue of the movie on Vestron Video was heavily cut by the BBFC.

The film has been released on DVD by Lionsgate as part of an 8 movie collection in 2011. It was released on Blu-ray in the US on September 27, 2016 as part of Lionsgate's new Vestron Video Collector's Series line.

Reception
 
On Rotten Tomatoes, it holds a 57% approval rating, based on 7 reviews. Horror review site Horrornews.net gave it a positive review, stating that "I had a blast watching Blood Diner. It is funny, full of some excellent death scenes, and is just a lot of fun to watch in general." In Creature Feature, the movie was given one out of five stars, finding it poorly done on purpose, with every tasteless gag imaginable included. TV Guide found that while the movie was an attempt to pay tribute to the films of Herschell Gordon Lewis, the contempt the director injected into the movie for the source material left little of value.

References

External links
 
 
 

1987 films
American comedy horror films
1980s comedy horror films
1987 horror films
American splatter films
Parodies of horror
1987 comedy films
1980s English-language films
Films directed by Jackie Kong
1980s American films